Caiari Airport, formerly , was the airport that served Porto Velho, Brazil until 1969, when Governador Jorge Teixeira de Oliveira International Airport was opened. On that very occasion the airport was closed.

History
Caiari Airport was the first airport of Porto Velho, Brazil. Because of its proximity to the urban center, the airport was closed on April 16, 1969, when Governador Jorge Teixeira de Oliveira International Airport was opened at a different location.

The former runway had one of its thresholds at the corner of present Farqhar and Pinheiro Machado Avenues. This area is now totally urbanized.

Cruzeiro do Sul, Panair do Brasil, Paraense Transportes Aéreos, and VASP once served the airport.

Access

References

External links

Defunct airports in Brazil
1969 disestablishments
Porto Velho